Carex geyeri is a species of sedge known by the common names Geyer's sedge and elk sedge. It is native to western North America from British Columbia to California to Colorado, where it grows in dry areas in mountain meadows, grasslands, and open forest. This sedge produces scattered tufts of stems connected by a network of long rhizomes. The stems are triangular in cross-section and approach half a meter in maximum height. The inflorescence is composed of a cluster of staminate flowers and a cluster of pistillate flowers separated by a node.

Gallery

External links
Jepson Manual Treatment
USDA Plants Profile
Flora of North America
Forest Service Fire Ecology
Photo gallery

geyeri
Plants described in 1846